Prunus wurdackii is a species of Prunus found only on the slopes of tepuis of the Chimantá Massif in Venezuela, at 900 to 2200m in elevation. Judging from its morphology, it is closely related to Prunus espinozana, described in the same publication. It is a tree 3 to 15m tall, with branchlets that are brown tending to black. It differs from Prunus littlei, another close relative, in having thicker, more leathery and more lustrous leaves, with longer (8 to 14mm) petioles. Its solitary inflorescences, by contrast, have shorter pedicels and shorter styles. Its calyx is salmon-colored, and the petals white.

References

wurdackii
Endemic flora of Venezuela
Plants described in 1997
Flora of the Tepuis